Mordellistena malaccana is a species of beetles is the family Mordellidae.

References

malaccana
Beetles described in 1854